Tymochtee is an unincorporated community in Wyandot County, in the U.S. state of Ohio.

History
A post office called Tymochtee was in operation between 1823 and 1894. The community takes its name from nearby Tymochtee Creek.  Tymochtee is a name derived from the Wyandot language meaning "stream around the plains".

References

Unincorporated communities in Wyandot County, Ohio
Unincorporated communities in Ohio
1823 establishments in Ohio
Populated places established in 1823